Thomas Frank Holmes (born 1931) is a British far-right politician. He was the chairman of the National Front between 1998 and 2009, and has been a long-standing member of the movement.

Holmes has been involved in nationalist politics since 1958.

Views 
Holmes is a strong supporter of European nationalism and has stated, "I have contacts with people all over Europe: Austria, Italy, France, Germany, Spain, Greece, Serbia, but none of these are official contacts, we have unofficial contacts, yes, we support any European nationalist party." He has also been highly critical of the British National Party, claiming that it is no longer truly white nationalist and condemning it for having a Sikh columnist in the party's newspaper.

General elections contested

References

1931 births
Living people
Leaders of the National Front (UK)
English far-right politicians